Jaroslav Uhlíř (born 14 September 1945) is a Czech composer and pianist from Prague. In the early 1970s, he was a member of the rock bands Providence and Faraon, together with bassist Karel Šíp. Later, he composed music for Czechoslovak National Radio, where he met Zdeněk Svěrák. With him, Uhlíř released many albums of children's music. He also hosted the television show Hitšaráda and later Galašaráda, where he collaborated with Šíp. In the 1980s, Uhlíř formed the parody group Triky a pověry with Šíp and Petra Janů. Between 1988 and 2017, Uhlíř worked with Zdeněk Svěrák on the children's music television show Hodina zpěvu, which spawned a number of operettas, such as O Budulínkovi and O dvanácti měsícčkách. Three of these became the basis of the Jan Svěrák film Three Brothers in 2014.

Uhlíř has composed music for the films Long Live Ghosts! (1977), Waiter, Scarper! (1981), S čerty nejsou žerty (1984), Lotrando a Zubejda (1997), among others.

Selected discography

With Zdeněk Svěrák
 Hodina zpěvu (1992)
 Není nutno… (1993)
 …aby bylo přímo veselo (1994)
 Hlavně nesmí býti smutno… (1995)
 …natož aby se brečelo (1997)
 Zpěvník (compilation, 1997)
 Nemít prachy – nevadí… (1999)
 Vánoční a noční sny (2000)
 Nemít srdce – vadí… (2001)
 …zažít krachy – nevadí! (2003)
 …zažít nudu – vadí! (2005)
 20 let písniček z pořadu Hodina zpěvu (compilation, 2007)
 Hity a skorohity (compilation, 2008)
 Takovej ten s takovou tou (2009)
 Písničky o zvířatech (compilation, 2010)
 Alchymisti (2011)
 Jupí (2014)
 Operky (compilation, 2016)
 Cirkusový stan (2016)
 Ty nejlepší písničky v novém kabátě (2016)

With Karel Šíp
 Šíp a Uhlíř v Hitšarádě (1985)
 Když jsou na to dva (1989)
 A další hity (1990) – with Triky a pověry
 Šíp a Uhlíř v Šarádě (1993)

References

External links

 

1945 births
Living people
Czech pianists
Czech composers
Czech male composers
Czech film score composers
Czech male singers
Musicians from Prague
Male pianists
21st-century pianists
21st-century Czech male musicians